Francisco "Franky" Carrillo was wrongfully convicted of the 1991 shooting murder of Donald Sarpy. His conviction was reversed by the Los Angeles County Superior Court on March 14, 2011, after he had served twenty years in prison. 

His conviction relied on eyewitness testimony from six people. The witnesses later admitted they did not have a view of the shooter, and instead had been influenced by police officers, and each other, to identify Carrillo. Two men since confessed to the crime, and stated Carrillo was not involved. 

Although always protesting his innocence, Carrillo was found guilty at his initial trial, and subsequent appeals. After Carrillo's case was taken on by Ellen Eggers, the Northern California Innocence Project, and attorneys from Morrison & Foerster, LLP, he was able to conclusively prove his innocence.

Carrillo's story has twice been featured on the podcast Strangers by Lea Thau. He is married, has 3 children, and is planning a run for the California State Assembly. His story is also told in the Netflix series The Innocence Files.

References

External links
 Murder conviction overturned after Francisco Carrillo spent 20 years in L.A. jail - Crimesider - CBS News
 Juvenile hall: An Easter exercise in forgiveness - Los Angeles Times
 Man goes free after murder conviction is overturned – Los Angeles Times
 California man freed after 20 years behind bars - World Updates | The Star Online

Overturned convictions in the United States
Living people
1970s births
Year of birth missing (living people)
American people wrongfully convicted of murder